Nuta, Nuța  or Nuță may refer to
Nudie Cohn (born Nuta Kotlyarenko; 1902–1984), Ukrainian-born American tailor
Nuța Olaru (born 1970), Romanian American long-distance runner 
Petre Nuță (1928–?), Romanian cyclist 

Romanian-language surnames
Romanian feminine given names